Ithycythara is a genus of small sea snails, marine gastropod mollusks in the family Mangeliidae.

Description
The spiral sculpture is lacking or consists of microscopic striae. There may be a peripheral keel and a few basal threads.

This genus is closely related to Pseudorhaphitoma.

Distribution
Species in this marine genus of seasnails occur in the Western Atlantic, the Caribbean Sea and the Gulf of Mexico.

Species
Species within the genus Ithycythara include:
 Ithycythara acutangulus (Smith E. A., 1882)
 Ithycythara altaspira Paulmier, 2019
 Ithycythara antillensis Paulmier, 2019
 Ithycythara apicodenticulata Robba et al., 2003
 Ithycythara auberiana (d’Orbigny, 1847)
 Ithycythara chechoi Espinosa & Ortea, 2004
 Ithycythara cymella (Dall, 1889)
 Ithycythara eburnea Paulmier, 2019
 Ithycythara fasciata Paulmier, 2019
 Ithycythara funicostata Robba et al., 2006
 Ithycythara hyperlepta Haas, 1953
 Ithycythara lanceolata (C. B. Adams, 1850)
 Ithycythara oyuana (Yokoyama, 1922)
 Ithycythara parkeri Abbott, 1958
 Ithycythara penelope (Dall, 1919)
 Ithycythara pentagonalis (Reeve, 1845)
 Ithycythara psila (Bush, 1885)
 Ithycythara rubricata (Reeve, 1846)
 Ithycythara septemcostata (Schepman, 1913)
Species brought into synonymy
 Ithycythara edithae Nowell-Usticke, 1971: synonym of Cryoturris edithae (Nowell-Usticke, 1971)
 † Ithycythara kellumi Fargo, W. G., 1953: synonym of  Ithycythara psila (Bush, 1885)
 Ithycythara muricoides (C. B. Adams, 1850): synonym of Ithycythara lanceolata (C. B. Adams, 1850)
Extinct species
 † Ithycythara defuniak Gardner 1938
 † Ithycythara elongata Gabb 1873
 † Ithycythara ischna Woodring 1928
 Ithycythara lanceolata Adams 1850 (Recent and fossil)
 † Ithycythara maera Woodring 1928
 Ithycythara psila Bush 1885 (Recent and fossil)
 † Ithycythara psiloides Woodring 1928
 † Ithycythara scissa Woodring 1928
 † Ithycythara tarri Maury 1910

References

 W. P. Woodring. 1928. Miocene Molluscs from Bowden, Jamaica. Part 2: Gastropods and discussion of results. Contributions to the Geology and Palaeontology of the West Indies
 W. P. Woodring. 1970. Geology and paleontology of canal zone and adjoining parts of Panama: Description of Tertiary mollusks (gastropods: Eulimidae, Marginellidae to Helminthoglyptidae). United States Geological Survey Professional Paper 306(D):299–452
 Paulmier G. (2019). Le genre Ithycythara (Conoidea, Mangeliinae) aux Antilles françaises. Description de 4 nouvelles espèces. Xenophora Taxonomy. 25: 3-10. page(s): 8, figs 24-27

External links
 Todd, Jonathan A. "Systematic list of gastropods in the Panama Paleontology Project collections." Budd and Foster 2006 (1996)
   Bouchet P., Kantor Yu I., Sysoev A. & Puillandre N. (2011) A new operational classification of the Conoidea. Journal of Molluscan Studies 77: 273–308.
 Worldwide Mollusc Species Data Base: Mangeliidae
  Tucker, J. K. 2004 Catalog of recent and fossil turrids (Mollusca: Gastropoda). Zootaxa 682:1–1295.

 
Gastropod genera